Grupul 2 Aeronautic ("2nd Aeronautical Group" in English), also known as Grupul 2 Aviație ("2nd Aviation Group") was one of the three groups of the Romanian Air Corps created following the aviation reorganization in the winter of 1916/1917.

History
As a result of this reorganization, the aviation was composed of 3 Aeronautical
Groups with 6 reconnaissance squadrons, 4 fighter squadrons, 1 long-range reconnaissance squadron, 1 bombardment squadron and 5 aerostation companies. Each Aeronautical Group was assigned to a Romanian or Russian army. Grupul 2 Aeronautic, headquartered at Tecuci was initially assigned to the 4th Russian Army.

The group, commanded by Major (Maj.) Andrei Popovici, was composed of 1 fighter and 2 reconnaissance squadrons: 
Escadrila F.4 - commanded by Captain (Cpt.) Haralambie Giossanu
Escadrila F.7 - commanded by Cpt. André Goulin
Escadrila N.3 - commanded by Cpt. Maurice Gond

From the beginning of the summer of 1917, in preparation for the military operations, 2 new squadrons were created: Escadrila F.9, commanded by Cpt. Bertrand de Fraguier and Escadrila N.11, Cpt. by Captain Ștefan Protopopescu and the group was re-assigned to the 1st Romanian Army. Escadrila C.12 was also assigned to the group.

Campaign of 1917
During the course of the month of June 1917, airmen from all of the aeronautical groups carried out reconnaissance, bombing and artillery fire directing missions over the enemy lines. The squadrons of Grupul 2 Aeronautic, together with Grupul 1 Aeronautic directly contributed to the success of the Battle of Mărăști. During the Battle of Mărășești, reconnaissance missions protected by the fighter aircraft were carried out consistently over the front of the 1st Romanian Army. In the front sectors where the Romanian artillery did not cause enough damage, the airmen of the F.4 squadron carried out bombing raids. The N.11 and N.3 squadrons protected the front from enemy airplanes, engaging in aerial fights almost every day. On 6 August 1917, the airmen of F.7 and F.4 squadrons managed to spot the retreating Russian troops, alerting the Romanian Headquarters just in time, allowing the 5th Romanian Division to intervene and stop the German advance.

On 10 August 1917, Grupul 2 Aeronautic executed 38 combat missions, taking photographs of enemy artillery batteries, aerodromes and other installations, providing information on troop movements as well as directing friendly artillery fire. During the night, bombing raids were carried out on key targets. On 19 August, the F.7 and F.9 squadrons attacked the enemy troops, executing a number of 14 bombing missions, at the same time they directed the Russian and Romanian heavy artillery fire on the enemy positions. During the month of August 1917, the pilots of Escadrila N.11 achieved a high number of flight hours with Ion Muntenescu achieving 50 flight hours, Egon Nasta-47 hours, Vasile Craiu-41 hours and Paul Magâlea-35 hours.

Starting from 22 September 1917, Grupul 2 Aeronautic was reorganized, now being composed of: 
Escadrila F.5 - with the aerodrome at Domneşti
Escadrila F.9 - at 
Escadrila N.3 and Escadrila N.11 - both at Tecuci

On 7 November 1917, Romanian pilots of the N.11 and F.9 squadrons shot down 5 enemy aircraft.

1918
From January 1918, Grupul 2 Aeronautic, commanded by Maj. Sever Pleniceanu, was organized as such:
Escadrila F.5 - with the aerodrome at Bârlad
Escadrila S.8 
Escadrila N.11 - at Adjud
Escadrila N.3 - at Tecuci

The first combat missions of 1918 on the Romanian front were carried out by the pilots of the N.11 squadron who attempted to intercept 3 Russian SPADs which were flying over Galați, however, they were unsuccessful due to the greater speed of the SPADs.

Following Order no. 275/1918, Grupul 2 Aeronautic moved Escadrila S.8 to Bârlad, together with Escadrila S.5 (ex-F.5). The other squadrons remained on the same aerodromes.

See also
 Grupul 1 Aeronautic
 List of Romanian Air Force units

References

Aviation history of Romania
Romania in World War I
Romanian Air Corps units